Fat Thursday is a Christian tradition in some countries marking the last Thursday before Lent and is associated with the celebration of Carnival. Because Lent is a time of fasting, the days leading up to Ash Wednesday provide the last opportunity for feasting (including simply eating forbidden items) until Easter. Traditionally it is a day dedicated to eating, when people meet in their homes or cafés with their friends and relatives and eat large quantities of sweets, cakes and other meals usually not eaten during Lent. Among the most popular all-national dishes served on that day are pączki in Poland or Berliners, fist-sized donuts filled with rose hip jam, and angel wings (faworki), puff pastry fingers served with powdered sugar.

By country

Poland
In Poland, Fat Thursday is called . People purchase their favorite pastries from their local bakeries. Traditional foods include pączki (doughnuts), which are large deep-fried pieces of yeast dough, traditionally filled with fruit jam or rose petal jam (though others are often used) and topped with powdered sugar, icing or glaze. Angel wings ( or ) are also commonly consumed on this day.

Germany
 is an unofficial holiday in the Rhineland. At the majority of workplaces, work ends before noon. Celebrations start at 11:11 am in Germany. In comparison with Rosenmontag, there are hardly any parades, but people wear costumes and celebrate in pubs and in the streets. ("women's carnival in Beuel") is traditionally celebrated in the Bonn district of Beuel. The tradition is said to have started here in 1824, when local women first formed their own "carnival committee". The symbolic storming of the Beuel town hall is broadcast live on TV. In many towns across the state of North Rhine Westphalia, a ritual "takeover" of the town halls by local women has become tradition. Among other established customs, on that day women cut off the ties of men, which are seen as a symbol of men's status.

Greece

The celebration, normally translated as Smelly Thursday, Charred Thursday, or Smoky Thursday, centers on the consumption of large amounts of grilled and roasted meats.

Italy
In Venice at the turn of the twentieth century, for example, it was marked by "masquerades, a battle of flowers on the Plaza, a general illumination and the opening of the lottery". The English writer Marie Corelli mentioned  (as "Giovedi Grasso") in her second novel, Vendetta (1886), as a day when "the fooling and the mumming, the dancing, shrieking, and screaming would be at its height."

Spain
In Aragon a meal is prepared with a special sausage from Graus while in Catalonia the tradition is to eat sweet Bunyols and Botifarra d’ou.

Other traditions
Syrian Catholics have celebrated the day as "Drunkard's Thursday" with dolmas as the traditional food.

See also
 Mardi Gras
 Maslenitsa (a similar holiday in Russia)
 Shrove Tuesday
 Tsiknopempti

References

External links
 Fat Thursday: Poland’s Tastiest Traditions on Culture.pl
 Polish movable feasts in Polish Wikisource

European culture
February observances
German traditions
Greek traditions
Holidays based on the date of Easter
Slavic carnival
Observances about food and drink
Polish traditions
Thursday observances
Easter traditions in Poland